Implementer may refer to:

 Implementer (video games), a software development role
 The Implementer role in the Belbin Team Role Inventories

See also
 Implement (disambiguation)